Alastair Ross (born 4 March 1981) is a former Unionist politician from Northern Ireland representing the Democratic Unionist Party (DUP).

Ross studied at Friends' School in Lisburn and at the University of Dundee before returning to study Irish Politics at Queen's University Belfast. While there, he became a Democratic Unionist Party (DUP) activist. In 2005, he began working for Sammy Wilson as a parliamentary researcher, following a spell in DUP headquarters as a press officer in the lead-up and during the 2005 general election. For the 2007 Northern Ireland Assembly election, he was the campaign manager for the party's three candidates in East Antrim, all of whom were elected.

Alastair Ross served in the Northern Ireland Assembly from 2007 until its collapse in 2017. He was re-elected in 2011 and 2016. Ross was a junior minister in the Executive Office of the Northern Ireland Assembly. He previously served on the Northern Ireland Policing Board, as well as being Chairman of the Assembly Committees for Justice, Standards and Privileges, as well as the ad hoc Ctte for the Mental Capacity Bill. He also served on the Environment, Education, Justice, Regional Development, Employment and Learning, and the ad hoc Committee on Sexual Offences Committees.

He was a member of the management committee of Lisnagarvey Hockey Club. His predecessor George Dawson, was one of the three DUP MLAs in East Antrim, and died shortly after the election. Ross was nominated by a closed list submitted by Dawson as his replacement.

Ross was viewed as being on the more pragmatic and moderate wing of the DUP and was a regular media performer for the Party.

In 2017 he announced he wouldn’t be seeking re-election to the 2017 Assembly elections and will be quitting politics completely.

Following his retirement from politics, Ross was appointed by the UK Parliament as one of ten UK Electoral Commissioners.

References

External links
 DUP selects Dawson replacement
 Official website
 Northern Ireland Assembly official website

1981 births
Living people
People educated at Friends' School, Lisburn
Alumni of the University of Dundee
Junior ministers of the Northern Ireland Assembly (since 1999)
Democratic Unionist Party MLAs
Northern Ireland MLAs 2007–2011
Northern Ireland MLAs 2011–2016
Northern Ireland MLAs 2016–2017